First Coast News is the newsroom of television stations WTLV (channel 12) and WJXX (channel 25), the NBC and ABC affiliates in Jacksonville, Florida, United States. It is owned with the stations by Tegna Inc.

The First Coast News brand was first used by the stations on April 27, 2000, in the wake of Gannett's acquisition of WJXX the month before and consequent expansion of what had primarily been WTLV's news department. Immediately upon taking control, WTLV newscasts were simulcast on WJXX. Since the consolidation, First Coast News has generally remained in second place in the market behind WJXT (channel 4), the market news leader.

History

Pre-FCN

When WTLV started as WFGA-TV in 1957, the station's first news director was Harold Baker, who had served in the same position at WSM radio and television in Nashville, Tennessee. Baker would anchor the station's 6 p.m. news for 17 years and direct the nascent channel 12 newsroom for 19 years in total, winning the station major national journalism awards. It settled in as a consistent second-place finisher to WJXT in local news, though it worked to close the gap, particularly after its acquisition by Gannett in 1988.

Meanwhile, in 1996, Allbritton Communications secured the ABC affiliation for the Jacksonville market from longtime third-rated station WJKS (channel 17). Originally planned to start in April, the outgoing ABC affiliate's preemptions of more than half of the network's prime time lineup caused Allbritton and the network to throw forward the launch of WJXX by two months to February 9, 1997. For most of the rest of that year, technical and signal issues dogged the new ABC affiliate, weighing on its public perception. While the station had been airing a local newsmagazine program, it was not until WJXX opened complete studios in south Jacksonville that it began to produce a full local news service on December 15, 1997. While ABC 25 News was hailed as a superior product compared to WJKS, which had aired just two 30-minute newscasts on weekdays, Allbritton faced several overwhelming factors in establishing WJXX: in addition to the technical issues that alienated viewers, the market had historically been an underperformer for the ABC network, and WJXT and WTLV were entrenched in the market. WJKS, which became The WB affiliate WJWB, surged past WJXX in the ratings.

Consolidation

On November 15, 1999, the FCC legalized television station duopolies—the common ownership of two stations in one market. The next day, November 16, Gannett announced it would purchase WJXX from Allbritton. The deal was initiated after Allbritton approached Gannett about a possible sale and was legal because of WJXX's unusually low ratings for an ABC affiliate. For the next four months, planning was initiated on the eventual consolidation of the WTLV and WJXX news operations, while WJXX continued to produce newscasts and faced a growing exodus of newsroom staffers.

The Federal Communications Commission approved the sale on March 16, 2000. Gannett consummated the purchase the next day and immediately implemented a simulcast of WTLV's newscasts on WJXX, while construction began at the WTLV studios on Adams Street—which had been enlarged in 1997—to prepare for a new combined news service under the name First Coast News, which debuted on April 27. Newscasts continued to be broadcast at the same time on each station, including the WJXX 7 p.m. newscast, which had no competition and was the station's lone successful news program. In total, 36 WJXX employees, including 13 in news, joined the WTLV operation.

A consistent second-place

After the merger, continuing a trend already set by WTLV, the gap in viewership between First Coast News and market leader WJXT slowly closed to create tough competition in the Jacksonville market. The combination of WTLV and WJXX also surpassed WJXT in total revenue.

In 2002, the news department of Fox affiliate WAWS (channel 30) expanded to accommodate the move of the CBS affiliation to WTEV (channel 47). The two stations rebranded as WFOX-TV and WJAX-TV in 2014 and their news as Action News as part of a wholesale change which included the firing of the previous main anchors. The Action News revamp improved ratings at the traditional third-place news operation in Jacksonville just as First Coast News remained without a news director for a year, causing a decline in viewership, and several key news personalities defected to Action News. Rob Mennie, who assumed the post of news director in 2014, noted of the newsroom as he encountered it, "This was a station ... I'll just use the word confused. They didn't know who they were. ... They were trying to figure out what makes us tick."

Notable staff
* Victor Blackwell – anchor, later of CNN
 Jeannie Blaylock – anchor (since )
 Donna Deegan (Hicken) – anchor (–2012)
 Curtis Dvorak – morning show contributor and co-host of First Coast Living
 Alan Gionet – anchor (–2006)
 Dan Hicken – sports anchor (–2013)
 Shannon Ogden – co-anchor (2006–2016)

References

External links
Official website

American news websites
Mass media in Jacksonville, Florida
2000 establishments in Florida
Tegna Inc.